The relationship between Achilles and Patroclus is a key element of the stories associated with the Trojan War. Its exact nature—whether homosexual, a non-sexual deep friendship, or something else entirely—has been a subject of dispute in both the Classical period and modern times. In the Iliad, Homer describes a deep and meaningful relationship between Achilles and Patroclus, where Achilles is tender toward Patroclus but callous and arrogant toward others. Homer never explicitly casts the two as lovers, but they were depicted as lovers in the archaic and classical periods of Greek literature, particularly in the works of Aeschylus, Aeschines and Plato.

In the Iliad

Achilles and Patroclus quarter together in a tent near their Greek allies fleet of ships. King Agamemnon realizes that Achilles, due to his heroic reputation, needs to enter the fight, but Achilles, having been disrespected by Agamemnon, refuses. Agamemnon sends an envoy to change his mind. In Book IX  (lines 225 to 241) the diplomats, Odysseus and Ajax, hear Achilles playing the lyre and singing all alone with Patroclus. They both spring to their feet in surprise as the guests enter. After much talk, the embassy fails to convince Achilles to fight.

After more battle, Nestor arrives back to the Greek allies base with a wounded soldier. Achilles sends Patroclus out to speak with him.  In Book XI (lines 786 to 804) Nestor reminds Patroclus that his father had long ago taught him that, although Achilles was nobler, he (Patroclus) was still Achilles' elder, and therefore he should counsel and guide Achilles wisely so that perhaps he would finally enter the fight against the Trojans, but if not, then he himself (Patroclus) should don  Achilles' armor to deceive the Trojans into thinking that Achilles had joined the fight, which should scare them away from their base and back to their own walls.

Later on, the Trojans continue their advance on the Greek allies base and breech the defensive wall guarding their ships. Patroclus eventually dons Achilles' armor and scares them back, as planned, he also ends up killing Sarpedon, a son of Zeus, but is eventually killed by Hector. News of Patroclus' death reaches Achilles through Nestor's son Antilochus, which throws Achilles into deep grief. The earlier steadfast and unbreakable Achilles agonizes, touching Patroclus' dead body, smearing himself with ash and fasting. He laments Patroclus' death using language very similar to the grief of Hector's wife. He also requests that when he dies, his bones be mixed with Patroclus' in a vase.

The rage that follows from Patroclus' death becomes the prime motivation for Achilles to return to the battlefield. He returns to battle with the sole aim of avenging Patroclus' death by killing Hector, despite a warning that doing so would cost him his life. After defeating Hector, Achilles drags his corpse by the heels behind his chariot.

Achilles' strongest interpersonal bond is with Patroclus. As Gregory Nagy points out:

 meant "companion" or "comrade"; in Homer it is usually used of soldiers under the same commander. In ancient texts,  (often translated "most beloved") denoted a general type of love, used for love between family, between friends, a desire or enjoyment of an activity, as well as between lovers.

Achilles' attachment to Patroclus is an archetypal male bond that occurs elsewhere in Greek culture: the mythical Damon and Pythias, the legendary Orestes and Pylades, and the historical Harmodius and Aristogeiton are pairs of comrades who gladly face danger and death for and beside each other.

In the Oxford Classical Dictionary, David M. Halperin writes:

Classical views in antiquity
In the 5th and 4th centuries BC, the relationship was portrayed as same-sex love in the works of Aeschylus, Plato, Pindar, and Aeschines.

In Athens, the relationship was often viewed as being loving and pederastic. Its ideal structure consisted of an older  (lover, protector), and a younger  (the beloved). The age difference between partners and their respective roles (either active or passive) was considered to be a key feature.

Aeschylus
Achilles publicly laments Patroclus' death, addressing the corpse and criticizing him for letting himself be killed. In a surviving fragment of the play, Achilles speaks of "the reverent company" of Patroclus' thighs and how Patroclus was "ungrateful for many kisses."

Pindar
Pindar's comparison of the adolescent boxer Hagesidamus and his trainer Ilas to Patroclus and Achilles in Olympian 10.16–21 (476 BC) as well as the comparison of Hagesidamus to Zeus' lover Ganymede in Olympian 10.99–105 suggest that student and trainer had a romantic relationship, especially after Aeschylus' depiction of Achilles and Patroclus as lovers in his play Myrmidons.

Plato
In Plato's Symposium, written , the speaker Phaedrus holds up Achilles and Patroclus as an example of divinely approved lovers. Phaedrus argues that Aeschylus erred in claiming Achilles was the  because Achilles was more beautiful and youthful than Patroclus (characteristics of the ) as well as more noble and skilled in battle (characteristics of the ). Instead, Phaedrus suggests that Achilles is the  whose reverence of his , Patroclus, was so great that he would be willing to die to avenge him.

Xenophon
Plato's contemporary, Xenophon, in his own Symposium, had Socrates argue that Achilles and Patroclus were merely chaste and devoted comrades. Xenophon cites other examples of legendary comrades, such as Orestes and Pylades, who were renowned for their joint achievements rather than any erotic relationship.

Aeschines
Further evidence of this debate is found in a speech by an Athenian politician, Aeschines, at his trial in 345 BC. Most ancient writers (among the most influential Aeschylus, Plutarch, Theocritus, Martial and Lucian) followed the thinking laid out by Aeschines.

Arguments against pederasty
According to William A. Percy III, there are some scholars, such as Bernard Sergent, who believe that in Homer's Ionian culture there existed a homosexuality that had not taken on the form it later would in pederasty. However, Sergent and others have argued that it had, though it was not reflected in Homer. Sergent asserts that ritualized man-boy relations were widely diffused through Europe from prehistoric times.

Achilles is the most dominant, and among the warriors in the Trojan War he has the most fame. Patroclus performs duties such as cooking, feeding, and grooming the horses, yet is older than Achilles. Both characters also sleep with women:

Other interpretations from antiquity
Attempts to edit Homer's text were undertaken by Aristarchus of Samothrace in Alexandria around 200 BC. Aristarchus believed that Homer did not intend the two to be lovers. However, he did agree that the "we-two alone" passage did imply a love relation and argued it was a later interpolation.

When Alexander the Great and his confidant Hephaestion passed through the city of Troy on their Asian campaign, Alexander honoured the sacred tomb of Achilles and Patroclus in front of the entire army, and this was taken as a clear declaration of their own relationship. The joint tomb and Alexander's action demonstrates the perceived significance of the Achilles-Patroclus relationship at that time (around 334 BC).

Post-classical and modern interpretations

Commentators from the Classical period interpreted the relationship through the lens of their own cultures. The post-classical tradition shows Achilles as heterosexual and having an exemplary platonic friendship with Patroclus. Medieval Christian writers deliberately suppressed the homoerotic nuances of the figure.

David Halperin compares Achilles and Patroclus to the traditions of Jonathan and David, and Gilgamesh and Enkidu, which are approximately contemporary with the Iliad's composition. He argues that while a modern reader is inclined to interpret the portrayal of these intense same-sex male warrior friendships as being fundamentally homoerotic, it is important to consider the greater themes of these relationships:

According to Halperin, these extra-institutional relationships were of necessity portrayed by using the language of other, institutionalized love relationships, such as those of parent/child and husband/wife. This can explain the overtones in Book 19 of the Iliad wherein Achilles mourns Patroclus (lines 315–337) in a similar manner used previously by Briseis (lines 287–300).

Shakespeare
William Shakespeare's play Troilus and Cressida portrays Achilles and Patroclus as lovers in the eyes of the Greeks. Achilles' decision to spend his days in his tent with Patroclus is seen by Odysseus (called Ulysses in the play) and many other Greeks as the chief reason for anxiety about Troy.

Achilles in Vietnam
Jonathan Shay, whose book Achilles in Vietnam proposes readings of the Iliad that have been helpful and therapeutically useful for the healing of mental wounds in Vietnam veterans, pointed out that their familial relationship in the Iliad must not be overlooked: Patroclus is Achilles' cousin and his foster brother; symbolically, comrades in battle are "like brothers," making the Achilles/Patroclus model useful for thinking about the intensity of Vietnam veterans' feelings of loss when their comrades fell beside them. Shay places a strong emphasis on the relationships that soldiers who experience combat together forge, and points out that this kind of loss has in fact often led to "berserking" of soldiers stunned with grief and rage, in a way similar to the raging of Achilles in the Iliad. Shay points out that a frequent topos in veterans' grief for a companion is that companion's gentleness or innocence; similarly, while a warrior of great note, Patroclus is said in the Iliad by other soldiers and by Briseis the captive to have been gentle and kind.

Troy (2004)
The film Troy presented Patroclus as a younger relative of Achilles, without any romantic or sexual aspects. (In the Iliad, it is explicitly stated that Patroclus was the older and more responsible of the two.)

The Song of Achilles
Madeline Miller's The Song of Achilles (2011) is a coming-of-age story told from Patroclus' point of view, showing the development of a loving and sexual relationship between Achilles and Patroclus.

See also
Homosexuality in ancient Greece
Homosexuality in the militaries of ancient Greece
Nisus and Euryalus

Notes

References

Achaean Leaders
Achilles
Fictional LGBT couples
LGBT themes in Greek mythology
Same-sex couples
Fictional LGBT characters in literature